Abortion in Georgia may refer to:

 Abortion in Georgia (country)
 Abortion in Georgia (U.S. state)